Lytorhynchus is a genus of snakes of the family Colubridae.

Geographic range
Species of the genus Lytorhynchus are found from North Africa, eastward through the Middle East, to Pakistan and western India.

Species
Seven species are recognized as being valid.
 Lytorhynchus diadema (A.M.C. Duméril, Bibron & A.H.A. Duméril, 1854)
 Lytorhynchus gaddi  Nikolsky, 1907
 Lytorhynchus gasperetti Leviton, 1977
 Lytorhynchus kennedyi Schmidt, 1939
 Lytorhynchus maynardi Alcock & Finn, 1897
 Lytorhynchus paradoxus (Günther, 1875)
 Lytorhynchus ridgewayi Boulenger, 1887

Nota bene: A binomial authority in parentheses indicates that the species was originally described in a genus other than Lytorhynchus.

References

Further reading
Boulenger GA (1890). The Fauna of British India, Including Ceylon and Burma. Reptilia and Batrachia. London: Secretary of State for India in Council. (Taylor and Francis, printers). xviii + 541 pp. (Genus Lytorhynchus, pp. 322–323, Figure 98).
Boulenger GA (1893). Catalogue of the Snakes in the British Museum (Natural History). Volume I., Containing the Families ... Colubridæ Aglyphæ, part. London: Trustees of the British Museum (Natural History). (Taylor and Francis, printers). xiii + 448 pp. + Plates I-XXVIII. (Genus Lytorhynchus, p. 414).
Peters W (1862). "Über die von dem so früh in Afrika verstorbenen Freiherrn von Barnim und Dr. Hartmann auf ihrer Reise durch Aegypten, Nubien und dem Sennâr gesammelten Amphibien ". Monatsberichte der Königlich Preussischen Akademie der Wissenschaften zu Berlin 1862: 271–279. (Lytorhynchus, new genus, p. 272). (in German).
Smith MA (1943). The Fauna of British India, Ceylon and Burma, Including the Whole of the Indo-Chinese Sub-region. Reptilia and Amphibia. Vol. III.—Serpentes. London: Secretary of State for India. (Taylor and Francis, printers). xii + 583 pp. (Genus Lytorhynchus, p. 189).

Lytorhynchus
Snake genera
Taxa named by Wilhelm Peters